Gandarrapiddo!: The Revenger Squad is a 2017 Filipino superhero comedy film directed by Joyce Bernal and starred by Vice Ganda, Daniel Padilla, and Pia Wurtzbach. It is distributed and produced by Star Cinema, serving as an official entry to the 2017 Metro Manila Film Festival.

Plot
Madman and Mino had already took over the lair of superheroes owned by Professor Clean. Mino was imprisoned in a mirror. Gandarra, along with Higopa, Flawlessa, Barna and Pospora fought against Madman. Their battle caused the superstar lair to be destroyed. Madman told Gandarra to give to him the lipstick spear so that Mino would be released. But Gandarra refused, and Madman told her that Gandarra will never see her sister Cassandra again. Gandarra then killed Madman but, she was hit by a falling rock in the head. Before Professor Clean died, he told them to take care of Madman's son. When the superheroes try to save Gandarra, she suffered from amnesia. They took the boy named Chino and live like mortals. 

Years have passed, Gandarra, who is called Emi along with Chino and Juvie lived a decent life. Peppa/Barna told Pospora/Bulldog, Higopa/Luz-Luz and Flawlessa/Bokbok that Chino's powers are about to activate on his 21st birthday. Chino also is a fan of international model Cassandra Stockings, whom he saw in a racing event. It also found out that Cassandra is also Kweenie, a superhero who is known for spreading fake news around the internet. After Chino was fired from his job, he decided to join the Philippine Army, but Emi disagrees with his idea. As Chino's birthday draws near, Peppa formulated a plan in order to regain Gandarra's memory. They hit her in the head several times until she regained her memory. On his 21st birthday, Chino's powers began to be visible. He had the ability to run fast. He would also save people from Kweenie's men. Because of his speed, he was named as Rapido. This makes Kweenie more furious. Rapido then joined forces with Gandarra, Barna, Higopa, Flawlessa and Pospora. They identified themselves as "The Revengers Squad". Kweenie also remember her sister Emi. But, Mino told her that she was always absent during the times she needed her. When Cassandra was invited by Chino to their house, she felt sweaty and was given a towel. Suddenly, a big mole in her left cheek became visible, indicating that she was recognized by Emi. During a fight between Gandarra and Kweenie, Rapido became furious because he already knew that Gandarra killed his father Madman. He then took the lipstick spear and leave her. 

Rapido was asked by Mino, who disguised himself as Madman, his father to give the lipstick spear. As the power of the lipstick spear fuses the mirror, Mino was released from the mirror. Kweenie asked the help of The Revengers Squad. They fought against Mino, but Mino fought back and caused Gandarra to lose her powers. But, she came back and defeated Mino.

Cast and characters

Main cast
 Vice Ganda as Emerson "Emy" Mariposque / Gandarra : A low-cost cosmetics salesperson and cleaning rag maker who lives in a decrepit house with his brother, Chino. He suffered from memory loss after being involved in a "great battle" among super beings which took place years before the main story line of the film began. Before he lost his memory, he was a superhero named Gandarra who draws power from a bertud or artifact in a form of a lipstick which he later applies on himself to transform to his alter-ego. Gandarra's signature weapon is a Lipstick Spear.

Vice Ganda himself was involved in creating the costume design for his character. He said that he and the producers first decided on the color scheme of the costume and Vice said that he wanted the costume to be vibrantly colored while also look good to appeal to children. Elements of the mobile game, EverWing - which was popular at that time, as well as Sailor Moon was also incorporated in the costume.

Daniel Padilla as Chino Mariposque / Rappido : The 21 year old brother of Emy who is characterized as "siga with a heart". He possesses superhuman strength and supersonic speed who adopts the alias Rappido.

Director Joyce B. Bernal said that the costume design of Padilla's character was made to reflect the "manly character" and the superhuman speed ability of his character.
Pia Wurtzbach as Cassandra Stockings / Cassandra "Cassey" Mariposque / Kweenie :An orphan who became a rising fashion designer and international model who goes by the super-powered alias Kweenie. She possess combat skills, knowledge in advance technology and hypnosis ability known as "smizenopsis".

Wurtzbach's involvement in The Revenger Squad marks the first time that Wurtzbach will portray a lead role and a superhero character. Wurtzbach took refresher courses on acting before the filming of Gandarappido began. Her previous acting stint was a guest role in the television series Aryana. Director Bernal stated that the only "requirement" for the costume design of Kweenie is for it to be color gold as a nod to Wurtzbach being the titleholder of Miss Universe 2015

Supporting cast
Ejay Falcon as Mino : A supervillain who is trapped within a mirror. He seeks to get Gandarra's lipstick which would free him from his imprisonment.
Loisa Andalio as Velle : A close friend and neighbor of Chino Mariposque.
Justin James Quilantang as Juvee/Enrique Heal The only boy in the Mariposque household who is known for being mischievous. As a provider of food, he helps Barna in her superheroine battles.
Wacky Kiray as Bul-Dog / Pospora: A member of the Mariposque household who is a street cigarette vendor. As Pospora, he has the ability to control and produce fire like a match stick.
Lassy Marquez as Bokbok / Flawlessa : A loyal friend of Emy Mariposque who acts as a aunt-figure to Chino. He sells floors as a living and as Flawlessa he draws powers from his pimples (or pimplets as he calls them) which he can multiply at will to use as his weapons.
MC Calaquian as Luz-Luz / Higopa A soda reseller who lives with the Mariposques. As the superhero Higopa, he possess indestructible fat and has the ability the engulf and puff virtually anything.
Karla Estrada as Peppa/BarnaThe annoying neighbor of the Mariposques who runs a food delivery business. As the superheroine, Barna, she draws power from food.
RK Bagatsing as Renz / Madman : A supervillain who is the real biological father of Chino and Gandarra´s greatest enemy.
Carlo Mendoza as himself
Michael Flores as Professor Clean
Alvin Ronquillo
Warren Tablo

Cameo role
Zanjoe Marudo as Emy's love interest
Kathryn Bernardo as Chino's love interest
Marlon Stockinger as Cassey's love interest
Julia Barretto as Chino's rescue
TNT Boys

Kris Aquino was offered to make a cameo appearance in the film to portray an antagonistic role. She declined saying that companies managing the brands she endorses may not be amicable to her playing a role of an antagonist.

Production
Gandarrapiddo was initially known to the public under at least two working titles, the first being simply known as The Revengers. In August 2017, it was announced that the name of the film was changed to  Gandarah N’ Gwapito: The Revengers. Principal photography of Gandarappiddo: The Revenger Squad officially began by July 2017.

Release
Gandarappiddo: The Revenger Squad premiered in Philippine cinemas on December 25, 2017, as one of the eight official entries of the 2017 Metro Manila Film Festival.

Marketing
An official microsite for The Revenger Squad was launched on December 13, 2017. The official theme song of the film is "Gigil si Aquo", a music video featuring Vice Ganda, also released as additional marketing efforts for the film. A lyric video was later released which featured the characters of Vice Ganda, Daniel Padilla, and Pia Wurtzbach and included "never-before-seen moments on set". According to critics, the song resembles Blackpink's Boombayah.

Reception

Potential sequel
In January 2018, Vice Ganda, and Pia Wurtzbach two of the stars of The Revengers Squad'', hinted that the film might have a sequel remarking that there is still yet to be explored regarding the characters of film.

References

External links

2010s superhero comedy films
Philippine action comedy films
2010s fantasy comedy films
Philippine parody films
Star Cinema comedy films
Viva Films films
Philippine superhero films
2017 comedy films
Films directed by Joyce Bernal